Plamen Jelyazkov (original name: Пламен Желязков, born  in Asenovgrad) is a Bulgarian male weightlifter, competing in the 77 kg category and representing Bulgaria at international competitions. He participated at the 1996 Summer Olympics in the 70 kg event. He competed at world championships, most recently at the 2003 World Weightlifting Championships.

Zhelyazkov became IWF World Weightlifter of the Year in 1998. He set five world records in the lightweight and middleweight classes from 1998-2002 – three in the snatch and two in the total.

Major results

References

External links
 

1972 births
Living people
Bulgarian male weightlifters
Weightlifters at the 1996 Summer Olympics
Olympic weightlifters of Bulgaria
People from Asenovgrad
World Weightlifting Championships medalists
World record setters in weightlifting
European Weightlifting Championships medalists
20th-century Bulgarian people